Elizabeth East is a northern suburb of Adelaide, South Australia in the City of Playford.

Demographics

The  by the Australian Bureau of Statistics counted 4,400 people in the suburb of Elizabeth East on census night. Of these, 2,196 (49.5%) were male and 2,239 (50.5%) were female.

The majority of residents 2,791 (63.1%) were Australian born, with 452 (10.2%) born in England.

The age distribution of Elizabeth East residents is similar to that of the greater Australian population. 67.9% of residents were aged 25 or over in 2016, compared to the Australian average of 68.8%; and 32.3% were younger than 25 years, compared to the Australian average of 31.5%.

References

Suburbs of Adelaide